The 1953–54 season was the 6th season of competitive football in Israel and the 28th season under the Israeli Football Association, established in 1928, during the British Mandate.

IFA competitions

League competitions

1953–54 Israel State Cup

The competition took place between 21 March 1953 and 3 July 1954. Maccabi Tel Aviv beaten Maccabi Netanya 4–0 in the final.

National Teams

National team

1954 World Cup qualification (Group 10)

1953–54 matches

1953 Maccabiah Games

The national team represented Israel in the 1953 Maccabiah Games, competing against other 6 teams of Jewish footballers. Israel won all its matches, scoring 27 goals and conceding just one goal, and won the gold medal.

Notes

References

   
Seasons in Israeli football